is the original soundtrack of the 2001 film Swordfish.  It was produced by Paul Oakenfold under Village Roadshow and Warner Bros. and distributed through London Sire Records, Inc.

As of 2001 it has sold 130,000 copies in United States according to Nielsen SoundScan.

Track listing

Charts

References

External links

Paul Oakenfold albums
2001 soundtrack albums
Action film soundtracks
Thriller film soundtracks